Randall Ridge is an arc-shaped rock ridge at the north side of the Guthridge Nunataks, in the Gutenko Mountains of central Palmer Land. Mapped by the United States Geological Survey (USGS) in 1974. Named by Advisory Committee on Antarctic Names (US-ACAN) after Robert H. Randall (1890–1966), Assistant on Cartography with the U.S. Bureau of the Budget in the Executive Office of the President, with responsibility for coordinating the mapping activities of the Government, 1941–60. In 1954 he set up the Technical Advisory Committee on Antarctic Mapping that established a mapping program for Antarctica based on the best technical methods.

Ridges of Palmer Land